One Victory Park is a skyscraper in Uptown Dallas.

On October 27, 2008 Haynes and Boone moved into One Victory Park; the firm was the first major tenant that moved into the building. The offices of higher ranked employees were the same size as those of lower ranked employees so efficiency could be increased. The company announced that it was moving its headquarters in 2006.

In 2007 PlainsCapital Corporation announced that it is leasing  in One Victory Park; it is the second major tenant to sign a lease for space in the Victory Tower.

References

External links
 One Victory Park

Skyscraper office buildings in Dallas